Leslie Irvine (born 23 June 1958 in Derry, Northern Ireland) is a former Northern Irish professional football referee. He was a full international for FIFA until his retirement in 2003. He refereed four Irish Cup finals.

References 

1958 births
Living people
Sportspeople from Derry (city)
British football referees